The following painters, sculptors and photographers are from the Dominican Republic, or of Dominican descent.

A–B
Silvio Avila (born 1965) - Higüey, Dominican Republic (DO)
Firelei Báez (born 1981) - Santiago de los Caballeros (Santiago) DO
Ada Balcácer (born 1930) - Santo Domingo DO
Alberto Bass (born 1949) - Santo Domingo DO
Cándido Bidó (1936–2011) - Santo Domingo DO

C
Arlette Cepeda - New York City US
Jaime Colson (1901–1975) - Puerto Plata DO
José García Cordero (born 1951) - Santiago DO
 Benjamin Cruz (born 1951) - Santo Domingo DO
Gaspar Mario Cruz (1925–2006) - San Francisco de Macorís DO
Duba Cruz (born 1973) - San Pedro de Macoris DO
Federico Cuello (born 1966) - Barahona DO

D–Z
Elsa Núñez (born 1943) - Santo Domingo DO
Miguel Vila Luna (1943–2005) - Santiago DO

References

External links